The A16 is an Italian autostrada connecting Naples and Canosa, before merging with the A14 autostrada.

The road is also known as "Autostrada dei Due Mari" (Motorway of the Two Seas) because it connects Naples, on the Tyrrhenian coast, with Bari, on the Adriatic coast.

On the night of 28 July 2013, a serious traffic accident occurred on the A16 near Avellino when a coach carrying pilgrims fell off a flyover into a ravine.  At least 39 people, including the driver, were killed and many others injured.

The acclaimed A16 Restaurants in San Francisco and Oakland, California, feature food from Campagna and are named for the autostrada.

Route

References 

A16
Transport in Campania
Transport in Apulia